The Mexican cottontail (Sylvilagus cunicularius) is a species of cottontail rabbit in the family Leporidae. It is endemic to Mexico where its natural habitats are temperate forests, subtropical or tropical dry forests and pastureland.

Taxonomy
The Mexican cottontail was first described by the English naturalist George Robert Waterhouse in 1848 as part of his work in classifying specimens in the collection of the museum of the Zoological Society of London. Three subspecies are recognized: Sylvilagus cunicularius cunicularius, S. c. insolitus, and S. c. pacificus.

Description
It has coarse reddish-brown or greyish-brown fur and white underparts. In maturity, the pelage becomes a paler, yellowish-gray color. Populations from the Sierra Madre de Oaxaca tend to be slightly larger than those in other parts of the range.

Behavior
The Mexican cottontail's breeding season occurs throughout the year, but especially during the warm and wet summer months (March to October). Mothers dig a nursery burrow to contain a nest before they give birth. Nests are constructed of several materials including dry grasses, pine needles, and bits of woody plants. Oat straw and alfalfa hay are used in the nest as additional food sources. Nursing occurs at the burrow entrance until the young are about 12 days old; after the offspring are weaned, the mother closes the burrow entrance. The burrowing behavior of the Mexican cottontail more closely resembles that of the European rabbit (Oryctolagus cuniculus) and the pygmy rabbit (Brachylagus idahoensis) than other cottontail rabbits.

Ecology, distribution and habitat
The Mexican cottontail is found only in Mexico where its range extends from the state of Sinaloa to the states of Oaxaca and Veracruz, including the mountainous regions of the Trans-Mexican Volcanic Belt. It ranges from sea level up to about 4,300 meters (14,000 feet). It occupies a wide range of habitats including tropical, temperate and dry deciduous forest, dense shrubland, grassland and cultivated or otherwise disturbed land. In central Mexico it is quite common in pine and pine/oak forests with a ground cover of tussocky grasses such as Agrostis, Festuca and Muhlenbergia. Predators of the Mexican cottontail include red foxes, coyotes, the long-tailed weasel, feral dogs, the great horned owl, and the red-tailed hawk.

Status
The Mexican cottontail is common over its range and is classified by the IUCN in its Red List of Threatened Species as being of least concern. It is present in the La Malinche National Park at densities of about 27 individuals per square kilometer. Despite this, its numbers may be dwindling in areas where it is hunted and in others where its habitat is being degraded and overgrazing is taking place.

References

Mexican Cottontail
Mexican cottontail
Fauna of the Trans-Mexican Volcanic Belt
Mexican cottontail
Mammals described in 1848
Taxonomy articles created by Polbot
Balsas dry forests